Zygmunt Łempicki (11 May 1886 in Sanok – 21 June 1943 in Auschwitz) was a Polish literature theoretician, Germanist, philosopher, and culture historian.

Łempicki was professor at the Warsaw University from 1919 until 1939, member of the Polish Academy of Skills and editor-in-chief of the "Świat i Życie" encyclopedia.

He was arrested and killed in the Nazi concentration camp Auschwitz.

Works
 Geschichte der deutschen Literaturwissenschaft... (1920)
 Renesans - oświecenie - romantyzm (1923)
 Wybór pism (t. 1-2 1966)

20th-century Polish philosophers
Polish people who died in Auschwitz concentration camp
20th-century Polish historians
Polish male non-fiction writers
Jews from Galicia (Eastern Europe)
People from the Kingdom of Galicia and Lodomeria
Austro-Hungarian Jews
People from Sanok
1886 births
1943 deaths
Polish Jews who died in the Holocaust
Jewish Polish writers
Members of the Lwów Scientific Society
Academic staff of the University of Warsaw